Richard Mansell (1813–1904) was an English railway engineer, on the South Eastern Railway.

Richard Mansell may also refer to:

Richard Maunsell (1868–1944), railway engineer (particularly on the South Eastern and Chatham Railway and later the Southern Railway)
Richard Mansell (golfer) (born 1995), English golfer
Richard Mansell, High Sheriff of Carmarthenshire
Richard Mansel, various baronets of Muddlescombe, in the County of Carmarthen